Periandra is a genus of flowering plants in the legume family Fabaceae, subfamily Faboideae.

Species 
 Periandra berteriana (DC.) Benth.
 Periandra coccinea (Schrad.) Benth.
 Periandra densiflora Benth.
 Periandra gracilis H.S.Irwin & Arroyo
 Periandra heterophylla Benth.
 Periandra mediterranea (Vell.) Taub.
 Periandra mediterranea var. mediterranea (Vell.) Taub.
 Periandra mediterranea var. mucronata (Benth.) N.F.Mattos & F.Oliveir
 Periandra pujalu Emmerich & L.M.de Senna

References 
 The Plant List entry
 Encyclopedia of Life entry
 USDA Germplasm Resources Information Network (GRIN) entry

Phaseoleae
Fabaceae genera